Samir Kozarac (born 21 August 1981) is a Swiss former professional footballer who played as a defensive midfielder. He started his career at Switzerland and in August 2008 moved to Dutch club Fortuna Sittard.

References

External links

Profile at Voetbal International 

Living people
1981 births
Bosnia and Herzegovina emigrants to Switzerland
Association football midfielders
Swiss men's footballers
Swiss Super League players
FC Baden players
FC Winterthur players
FC St. Gallen players
SC Kriens players
FC Wohlen players
Fortuna Sittard players
SV Wilhelmshaven players
SV Elversberg players
Swiss expatriate footballers
Swiss expatriate sportspeople in the Netherlands
Expatriate footballers in the Netherlands
Swiss expatriate sportspeople in Germany
Expatriate footballers in Germany